Azaguié is a town in south-eastern Ivory Coast. It is a sub-prefecture and commune of Agboville Department in Agnéby-Tiassa Region, Lagunes District. The border of Abidjan Autonomous District is three kilometres south of the town.

In 2021, the population of the sub-prefecture of Azaguié was 38,066.

Villages
The 6 villages of the sub-prefecture of Azaguié and their population in 2014 are:
 Abbé-Bégnini (2 627)
 Azaguié (13 876)
 Achiékoi (984)
 Azaguié-Makouguié (1 296)
 Azaguié-M'bromé (2 694)
 Donkoi (499)

References

Sub-prefectures of Agnéby-Tiassa
Communes of Agnéby-Tiassa